Robert Saxton (born 6 September 1943) is an English former professional footballer, manager and coach.

Career
Born in Doncaster, South Yorkshire, Saxton managed Blackburn Rovers for five seasons after a playing career as a utility defender with several lower division clubs. During his managerial career, he also took charge of Exeter City, Plymouth Argyle and York City. He later enjoyed a long career as a coach at various clubs including Manchester City, Newcastle United and Sunderland.

Managerial statistics

References

External links

1943 births
Living people
Footballers from Doncaster
English footballers
Association football defenders
Denaby United F.C. players
Derby County F.C. players
Plymouth Argyle F.C. players
Exeter City F.C. players
English Football League players
English football managers
Exeter City F.C. managers
Plymouth Argyle F.C. managers
Blackburn Rovers F.C. managers
York City F.C. managers
English Football League managers
Bolton Wanderers F.C. non-playing staff
Newcastle United F.C. non-playing staff
Sunderland A.F.C. non-playing staff
Blackpool F.C. non-playing staff